Miss French Guiana is a French beauty pageant which selects a representative for the Miss France national competition from the overseas region of French Guiana. The first Miss French Guiana was crowned in 1960, while the first Miss French Guiana to compete in Miss France was crowned in 1987. The regional competition has been held regularly since 1998.

The current Miss French Guiana is Shaïna Robin, who was crowned Miss French Guiana 2022 on 16 July 2022. One woman from French Guiana has been crowned Miss France:
Alicia Aylies, who was crowned Miss France 2017

Results summary
Miss France: Alicia Aylies (2016)
2nd Runner-Up: Radiah Latidine (1993)
Top 12/Top 15: Marie-Josée Nallamoutou-Sancho (1988); Nathalie Mathurin (1995); Sabrina Louis (1998); Céline Claire-Eugénie (2004); Mandy Nicolas (2007); Tineffa Naisso (2009); Anaële Veilleur (2011); Ruth Briquet (2017) ; Mélysa Stephenson (2021)

Titleholders

Notes

References

External links

Miss France regional pageants
Beauty pageants in France
Women in French Guiana